Antoine de Saint Exupéry Airport (Spanish: Aeropuerto Antoine de Saint Exupéry) is an airport serving San Antonio Oeste, a city in the Río Negro Province of Argentina. The airport is named after the French author-aviator Antoine de Saint-Exupéry.

Facilities
The terminal building is very similar in architectural design to others in the Patagonian region, basically of a simple, plain design with appropriately sized common areas, which provides an acceptable level of service for the area's normal traffic. However the terminal building also features a mural by Uruguayan artist Carlos Páez Vilaró in its main hall, painted in December 1989.

Southeast approach and departure may be over the water. The runway has greater than  unpaved overruns on each end. The San Antonio Oeste non-directional beacon (Ident: SAN) is located on the field.

History 
San Antonio Oeste's airport was renamed after the French writer-aviator Antoine de Saint-Exupéry, who frequently surveyed routes in the country as the director of Aeroposta Argentina, the company that created a stopover airport at that location en route to Comodoro Rivadavia. A small museum exhibit was created in the airport's terminal building honoring its origins. It came into being on October 31, 1929, when a flight route began between Comodoro Rivadavia and Bahia Blanca, with stops at San Antonio Oeste and Trelew. The following day Aeroposta Argentina inaugurated its regular service to the airport.

Due to a lack of facility, runway, and airport maintenance for over 20 years, commercial air services were discontinued to the airport in 2009. Currently only the local flying club and some private flights use the facility.

See also 

Transport in Argentina
List of airports in Argentina

References

External links 
OpenStreetMap - Antoine de Saint Exupéry Airport
FallingRain - Antoine de Saint Exupery Airport

Airports in Río Negro Province
Antoine de Saint-Exupéry